Athina Rachel Tsangari (born 2 April 1966) is a Greek filmmaker. Some of her most notable works include her feature films, The Slow Business of Going (2000), Attenberg (2010) and Chevalier (2015) as well as the co-production of Yorgos Lanthimos' films Kinetta (2005), Dogtooth (2009), and Alps (2011). In her versatile work for cinema, she has also founded and been director of the Cinematexas International Short Film Festival. In 2014-2015, she was invited to Harvard University’s Visual and Environmental Studies department as a visiting lecturer on art, film, and visual studies.

Life and career
Tsangari was born in Athens, Greece. She holds a university degree from the Faculty of Philosophy of the Aristotle University of Thessaloniki, and two post-graduate diplomas: an MA in performance studies from New York University's Tisch School of the Arts, and an MFA in film directing from the University of Texas at Austin.

Her first experience working in film was with a small role in Richard Linklater's 1991 film Slacker. Since then, Tsangari has assumed multiple roles within the film industry.

Film director
Her debut short film, Fit (1994), was created for her NYU studies and was shortlisted for the Annual Student Academy Awards.

For her MFA thesis, she created her first feature-length film, The Slow Business of Going (2000), a lo-fi/sci-fi road movie, shot in multiple formats (8mm, 16mm, mini-DV and 35 stills) in hotel rooms of nine cities around the world and then transferred the final cut of the film to 35mm. The film premiered at the Thessaloniki International Film Festival in 2000 and won best film at the New York Underground Film Festival in 2002. The film was described by Domitila Bedel in Senses of Cinema as "a permanent erection for the eye". The 2002 Village Voice Critics Poll listed it as one of the year’s “best first films” and it now belongs to MoMA’s permanent film collection.

Her second feature-length film, Attenberg (2010), premiered in the main competition at the 67th Venice International Film Festival, where it won the Coppa Volpi Award for Best Actress for its protagonist, Ariane Labed. The film was Greece's official entry for Best Foreign Language Film at the 84th Academy Awards. 

Her short film The Capsule (2012), commissioned by the Deste Foundation for Contemporary Art, was screened at the Locarno, Toronto and Sundance film festivals to critical acclaim. 

In 2013, she was one of seventy directors invited by the Venice Film Festival to participate in the project Venezia 70 - Future Reloaded, for which she made the short science fiction film 24 Frames Per Century (2013).

In 2013, she also created a fundraising film for the Benaki Museum, the pioneering museum of Greek heritage, narrated by Willem Dafoe.

In 2015, her third feature-length film Chevalier (2015) was released  — a buddy comedy set on a yacht in the Aegean Sea — premiered at the Locarno Film Festival. It won the Best Film prize in official competition at the BFI-London Film Festival 2015. It also received a Best Actor prize for its all-male ensemble cast, and a Jury Special Mention for directing, from the Sarajevo IFF. It had its North American premiere at the Toronto IFF, followed by the New York Film Festival to critical acclaim. Chevalier (2015) has also been nominated for the 2016 Foreign Language Film Oscar.

TV director
Tsangari directed two episodes of the Canal+/ ZDF/ Netflix historical drama series Borgia. 

Her most recent TV work includes the film direction of the BBC Two TV series, Trigonometry. The TV series premiered at the “Berlinale Series” section of Berlinale in 2020.

Film producer
In 2005, Tsangari founded Haos Film, a production and post-production studio based in Athens. Her producing credits include three films directed by Yorgos Lanthimos: Kinetta (2005), Dogtooth (2009), as an associate producer, and Alps (2011). She is a co-producer on Richard Linklater's Before Midnight (the third installment of the "Before Sunrise" series, shot in Messenia, Greece), where she also appeared in the role of Ariadni. 

Tsangari's film project Duncharon was awarded the ARTE France Cinéma Award for best project at the International Film Festival Rotterdam CineMart 2012.

Film festival work
In 1995, Tsangari founded and became the artistic director of the Cinematexas International Short Film Festival, a film festival for experimental work which ran until 2006. 

She also served as a creative advisor at the Sundance Feature Film Program Directing Lab and at the Sundance Istanbul and Jordan screenwriter labs. 

In 2013, she was a member of the jury at the 63rd Berlin International Film Festival. 

In 2017 she was on the World Dramatic Jury at the Sundance Film Festival and on the Cinéfondation and Short Films Jury at the Cannes Film Festival.

Projection designer
Tsangari served as the projection designer and video director on the creative team headed by Dimitris Papaioannou that designed the opening and closing ceremonies of the 2004 Summer Olympics in Athens.

She also designed the stage projections for the dance theatre work "2" by Dimitris Papaioannou in 2007. 

In 2008, she designed the video displays and projections for "A Greek Ceremony" - the Beijing Capital Museum Exhibit on the opening and closing ceremonies of the 2004 Summer Olympics. 

In 2009, she created "Reflections", a series of large-scale projections commissioned for the opening of the new Acropolis Museum in Athens.

Filmography

Feature films 
Director
The Slow Business of Going (2000)
Attenberg (2010)
Chevalier (2015)

Screenwriter
Attenberg (2010)
Chevalier (2015), co-written with Efthymis Filippou

Producer
The Slow Business of Going (2000)
Kinetta (2005), directed by Yorgos Lanthimos
Palestine Blues (2006), directed by Nida Sinnokrot
Dogtooth (2007), directed by Yorgos Lanthimos, associate producer
Lovers of Hate (2010), directed by Bryan Poyser, executive producer
Attenberg (2010)
Alps (2011), directed by Yorgos Lanthimos
Pearblossom Hwy (2012), directed by Mike Ott
 Before Midnight (2013), directed by Richard Linklater, co-producer
 Lake Los Angeles (2014), directed by Mike Ott, executive producer
 Petting Zoo (2015), directed by Micah Magee, co-producer
 Fireflies (2018), directed by Bani Khoshnoudi, co-producer

Actor
 Slacker as Cousin from Greece (credited as Rachel Reinhardt)
 Before Midnight as Ariadni

Shorts 
On Infection (1993), writer, director
Fit (1994), writer, director, editor
Fit #2 (1995), writer, director
Plant #1 (1996), writer, director
Anticipation™ (1996), co-directed with Nida Sinnokrot and Kenny Strickland
Pleasureland (2001), executive producer
The Wind Squeezes Glass Leaves (2002), animation, director
Funky Beep (2007), music video for K.Bhta, director
Marina № 5 / 20:04–21:10 UTC+8 / 31° 10' N 121° 28' E (2008), director
 The Capsule (2012), co-writer, director
 24 Frames per Century (2013) (segment of Venice 70 - Future Reloaded), co-writer, director
 The Benaki Museum (2013), narrated by Willem Dafoe, director, writer
 Sandy Beach (2016), producer
 After Before (2016), documentary short, director, producer

Television 
Borgia (TV series), director
 Trigonometry (BBC Two series), director

Projection design 
Opening and Closing Ceremonies of the Athens 2004 Olympic Games (2004), projection designer and video director
2 (2007), stage projection designer
A Greek Ceremony - Beijing Capital Museum Exhibit (2008), projection designer and video director
Reflections - Opening Ceremony of the New Acropolis Museum (2009), concept, director, projection designer

References

External links 
Official Haos Film website
Official Attenberg website

1966 births
Living people
Female music video directors
Greek women film directors
Greek music video directors
Greek women screenwriters
Tisch School of the Arts alumni
Moody College of Communication alumni
Aristotle University of Thessaloniki alumni
Film people from Athens